The enzyme UDP-glucuronate decarboxylase catalyzes the chemical reaction

UDP-D-glucuronate  UDP-D-xylose + CO2

This enzyme belongs to the family of lyases, specifically the carboxy-lyases, which cleave carbon-carbon bonds.  The systematic name of this enzyme class is UDP-D-glucuronate carboxy-lyase (UDP-D-xylose-forming). Other names in common use include uridine-diphosphoglucuronate decarboxylase, and UDP-D-glucuronate carboxy-lyase.  This enzyme participates in starch and sucrose metabolism and nucleotide sugars metabolism.  It employs one cofactor, NAD+.

Structural studies

References

 

EC 4.1.1
NADH-dependent enzymes
Enzymes of known structure